School District 06 is a defunct Canadian school district in New Brunswick.  It was an Anglophone district operating 27 public schools (gr. K-12) in Kings and part of Queens Counties.  In 2012 it was amalgamated into Anglophone South School District.  Enrollment was approximately 10,300 students with 650 teachers.  District 06 was headquartered in Rothesay.

List of schools

High schools
 Belleisle Regional
 Hampton High
 Kennebecasis Valley
 Rothesay
 Sussex Regional

Middle schools
 Hampton
 Harry Miller
 Quispamsis
 Rothesay Park
 Sussex

Elementary schools
 Apohaqui
 Belleisle
 Dr. A. T. Leatherbarrow
 Fairvale
 Hammond River Valley
 Hampton
 Kennebecasis Park
 Lakefield
 Norton
 Quispamsis
 Rothesay
 Sussex
 Sussex Corner

Combined elementary and middle schools
 Macdonald Consolidated

Private schools
 Rothesay Netherwood
 Sussex Christian
 Touchstone Community

Other schools
 Hampton Middle School Learning Centre
 Partners in Alternative Learning Strategies (Hampton)
 Partners in Alternative Learning Strategies (Sussex)
 PLATO Lab
 Portage N.B. Treatment Centre

External links
 Official Website

Former school districts in New Brunswick
Education in Kings County, New Brunswick
Education in Queens County, New Brunswick